Leigh Dragoon is a professional American comics writer and illustrator.

Biography
Leigh Dragoon's work first appeared in Girlamatic, publisher of her urban fantasy webcomic By the Wayside, which won the Kim Yale Award for Best New Female Talent in 2006. She contributed art to Sam Kieth's My Inner Bimbo graphic novel. In 2009 she wrote the script for the three-volume HarperCollins/Tokyopop manga series based on Frewin Jones' YA fantasy series The Faerie Path. She also contributed a story to the Fraggle Rock Vol. 1 graphic novel published by Archaia Studios Press in 2010. In 2011 she adapted the script for Richelle Mead's Vampire Academy graphic novel. She also scripted the graphic novel adaptations of Marie Lu's Legend, Prodigy, and Champion YA novels.  The adaptations are illustrated by Caravan Studio.  She is currently working on a fantasy retelling graphic novel of Little Women by Louisa May Alcott to be published by Oni Press.

Bibliography
 My Inner Bimbo (multiple artists, Sam Kieth, Oni Press, 2009)
 The Faerie Path: Lamia's Revenge #1: The Serpent Awakens (artist Alison Acton, HarperCollins/Tokyopop, 2009)
 The Faerie Path: Lamia's Revenge #2: The Memory of Wings (artist Alison Acton, HarperCollins/Tokyopop, 2009)
 Fraggle Rock (multiple contributors, Archaia Studios Press, 2010)
 Vampire Academy (artist Emma Vieceli, Razorbill, 2011)
 Frostbite (artist Emma Vieceli, Razorbill, 2012)
 Shadow Kiss (artist Emma Vieceli, Razorbill, 2013)
 Legend (artist Caravan Studio, Penguin Group LLC, 2015)
 Prodigy (artist Caravan Studio, Penguin Group LLC, 2016)
 Champion (artist Caravan Studio, Penguin Group LLC, 2017)
 
 
 
 Little Women: Magic in Concord (forthcoming, Oni Press)

References

External links
 

1976 births
American comics writers
Female comics writers
Living people
American webcomic creators
American female comics artists